The Captain's Bakery Western Confederation Super League is a second division football league in the nation of Jamaica.  The twelve teams that currently compete in the league are based in the parishes of Hanover, St. James, Trelawny and Westmoreland. 

At the end of each season the winners qualify for the National Premier League Playoff along with the winners of the KSAFA Super League, South Central Confederation Super League and Eastern Confederation Super League.

These four teams play each other, home and away, with the top two teams from this playoff being promoted to the Jamaica National Premier League.

Member teams 2010/11
Bamboo F.C. (Hanover)
Catherine Hall F.C. (Montego Bay, St James)
Exidus (Trelawny)
Frome F.C. (Westmoreland)
Granville F.C. (St James)
Mount Pelier F.C. (Montpelier, St James)
Petersfield (Westmoreland)
Prosper F.C. (Hanover)
Seba United F.C. (Montego Bay, St James)
Tomorrow's People 
Violet Kickers F.C. (Montego Bay, St James)
Wadadah F.C. (Montego Bay, St James)

Past Champions 
 2019:
 2018: Wadadah F.C.
 2017:. Sandals South Coast
 2016:. Granville Utd F.C
 2015:. Savannah S.C
 2014:  Reno F.C
 2013:  Wadadah F.C
 2012:
 2011: Seba United F.C.
 2010: Reno F.C.
 2009: Wadadah F.C.
 2008: Granville F.C.
 2007:
 2006:
 2005:
 2004:

References

2
Jam